Bacillary peliosis is a form of peliosis hepatis that has been associated with bacteria in the genus Bartonella.

References

Bacterial diseases
Diseases of liver